Tachimoto is a Japanese surname. Notable people with the surname include:

, Japanese judoka
, Japanese judoka

Japanese-language surnames